The 2015 Israeli Beach Soccer League was a national beach soccer league that took place between 12 June and 31 July 2015, in Netanya, Israel.

Group stage
All kickoff times are of local time in Netanya, Israel (UTC+02:00).

Group A

Group B

Relegation playoffs (Loser on Final is relegated)

Relegation playoffs

Knockout stage

Quarter-finals

Semi-finals

Survival match

Exhibition match

Final

Goalscorers
13 goals

 Amer Yatim (Bnei "Falfala" Kfar Qassem)

11 goals

 Dino (Bnei "Falfala" Kfar Qassem)

10 goals

 Y. Shina (Beitar "Itrader" Jerusalem)

9 goals

 Tzahi Ilos (Hapoel Ironi "Deal Tov" Petah Tikva)
 Avi Malca (Maccabi "Ido Keren" Haifa)

8 goals

 Kobi Badash (Maccabi "Doron Motors" Netanya)

7 goals

 Sameh Moreb (Bnei "Falfala" Kfar Qassem)
 Vitali Ganon ("Eli Cohen Hadbarot" Rosh HaAyin)
 Ferreira da Silva ("Landora" Bnei Yehuda "Nitzan")

6 goal

 Adam Mayer ("A.M.I. Yakutiel" Kfar Saba)
 Sharon Gormezano ("Eli Cohen Hadbarot" Rosh HaAyin)
 Wasim Agbaria (Maccabi "Ido Keren" Haifa)

5 goal

 Adir Danin (Maccabi "Doron Motors" Netanya)
 Kfir Malul ("A.M.I. Yakutiel" Kfar Saba)
 Ofir Halwani ("Yaniv Ilmazer" Holon)

Winners

Awards

External links
 Kfar Qassem on Beach Soccer Worldwide

See also
 Israeli Beach Soccer League

References

Israeli Beach Soccer League seasons
National beach soccer leagues
2015 in beach soccer